Itzehoe Eagles is a German basketball club, based in Itzehoe. The club currently plays in the ProB, the third tier of German basketball. Founded in 2015, the club plays its home games in the Sportzentrum Am Lehmwohld.

The club was part of the multi-sports club SC Itzehoe until 2015, when it separated from its mother club.

Notable players

 Jonathon Williams

References

External links
Official website (in German)

Basketball teams in Germany